Lone Oak is a city in Hunt County, Texas, United States. The population was 598 at the 2010 census, up from 521 at the 2000 census.

Geography

Lone Oak is located in southeastern Hunt County at  (32.995939, –95.940987). U.S. Route 69 runs through the center of the city, leading northwest  to Greenville, the county seat, and southeast  to Emory.

The city is in the watershed of the Sabine River.

History
Settlers first came to the area in the 1850s. The city was named after a lonely oak tree in the prairie. A post office was established in 1869. Tracks of the Missouri, Kansas and Texas Railroad were built through the area in 1890, and Lone Oak was incorporated that same year.

Demographics

As of the census of 2000, there were 598 people, 195 households, and 138 families residing in the town. The population density was 653.5 people per square mile (251.4/km). There were 234 housing units at an average density of 293.5 per square mile (112.9/km). The racial makeup of the town was 94.43% White, 3.07% African American, 0.19% Native American, 0.19% Asian, 1.54% from other races, and 0.58% from two or more races. Hispanic or Latino of any race were 3.84% of the population.

There were 195 households, out of which 32.8% had children under the age of 18 living with them, 54.9% were married couples living together, 8.7% had a female householder with no husband present, and 29.2% were non-families. 25.1% of all households were made up of individuals, and 14.4% had someone living alone who was 65 years of age or older. The average household size was 2.67 and the average family size was 3.20.

In the town the population was spread out, with 29.8% under the age of 18, 7.3% from 18 to 24, 28.2% from 25 to 44, 21.3% from 45 to 64, and 13.4% who were 65 years of age or older. The median age was 35 years. For every 100 females, there were 95.1 males. For every 100 females age 18 and over, there were 94.7 males.

The median income for a household in the town was $31,875, and the median income for a family was $43,000. Males had a median income of $24,821 versus $19,306 for females. The per capita income for the town was $15,459. About 10.4% of families and 12.8% of the population were below the poverty line, including 13.8% of those under age 18 and 24.2% of those age 65 or over.

Education
The city is served by the Lone Oak Independent School District.

Notable people
Cal Dorsett, former Major League Baseball player

References

Dallas–Fort Worth metroplex
Cities in Hunt County, Texas
Cities in Texas